CCIFF may refer to:

 Canada China International Film Festival
 Cape Cod International Film Festival